The Bathroom Wall is the debut studio album by American comedian Jimmy Fallon, released on August 27, 2002. The first five tracks of the album consists of studio songs, with the remainder of the album consisting of stand-up comedy material. The album is most notable for the song "Idiot Boyfriend" and its music video, in which actress and singer/songwriter Zooey Deschanel appears in the music video in the uncredited role of Fallon's girlfriend.

Track listing

Personnel 
 Jimmy Fallon - guitar, harmonica, vocals, background vocals
 Gerard Bradford - guitar, background vocals
 Mark Ronson - bass, keyboards, background vocals
 Justin Stanley - drums, keyboards, background vocals
 Peter Iselin - keyboard on "Drinking In The Woods"
 Nadia Dajani - background vocals on "(I Can't Play) Basketball"

Production 
 Producer: The Soundhustlers
 Engineers: Ben Arons, Dan Milazzo, and Kevin Scott
 Assistant engineers: Aaron Kaplan, Doug Sanderson, Antony Zeller
 Mixing: Mark Ronson, Justin Stanley, Marie C, and Gabe Chiesa
 Mastering: Brian Gardner
 Set Design: Michael DeNaire
 Design: Kyledidthis
 Photography: Mick Rock

Reception

Reviews 
Allmusic described it as Fallon's "mix tape of high school fights, bad athletic performances, and collegiate experimentation combined with a dose of rock & roll mayhem"; two of the songs ("Idiot Boyfriend" and "Road Rage") were AMG "Track Picks", as were two of the stand-up comedy routines ("Troll Doll Jingles" and "Hammertime").

The Rolling Stone liked the "fifteen minutes' worth of songs" and called "Idiot Boyfriend" the "second-best Prince parody ever, after Beck's 'Debra'"; the rest of the album was said to be "padded out with lame stand-up on college life (the fridges are small!), celebrity impressions and troll dolls."

Awards 
The Bathroom Wall was nominated for a Grammy in 2003 as the Best Spoken Comedy Album.

References 

Jimmy Fallon albums
2002 debut albums
2002 live albums
DreamWorks Records live albums
2000s comedy albums